Charles of Lorraine (Charles de Lorraine) may refer to:

Charles, Duke of Lower Lorraine (953–993)
Charles II, Duke of Lorraine (1364–1431)
Charles III, Duke of Lorraine (1543–1608)
Charles de Lorraine de Vaudémont (1561-1587), French Roman Catholic cardinal
Charles of Lorraine (bishop of Metz and Strasbourg) (1567–1607)
Charles IV, Duke of Lorraine (1604–1675)
Charles V, Duke of Lorraine (1643–1690)
Charles Alexander of Lorraine (1712–1780)
Charles of Lorraine, Duke of Mayenne (1554–1611)
Charles, Cardinal of Lorraine (1524–1574) 
Charles I, Duke of Elbeuf (1556–1605)
Charles II, Duke of Elbeuf (1596–1657)
Charles III, Duke of Elbeuf (1620–1692)
Charles, Count of Marsan (1648–1708)
Charles Henri, Prince of Vaudémont (1649–1723)
Charles, Prince of Commercy (1661–1702)
Charles Joseph of Lorraine (1680–1715)
Charles de Lorraine, Count of Armagnac (1684–1751)